Thor Bjorn Thorlei Aackerlund (born ) is a competitive video gamer considered one of the first to go professional.

As a child, he started playing computer games while waiting for a new school year to begin after having missed one due to his mother being hospitalized after a fire. He couldn't afford a Nintendo Entertainment System, so he bought a Game Boy but didn't have the money for any extra games, which put him on the path of playing Tetris, as it was included for free. He was one of the winners of the 1990 Nintendo World Championships, for which he was bestowed a Mario trophy, a  U.S. savings bond, a 1990 Geo Metro Convertible, a 40-inch rear-projection television, and a golden Mario trophy. Soon after the competition, Camerica, a producer of unlicensed Nintendo Entertainment System games, signed a deal with Aackerlund to make him the official spokesman for their games. Aackerlund then became the poster child for the game, featured in commercials and fairs. As a child, he felt pressured to play, as the prize money and endorsements were financially important for his family. At the time, he was known as the only player to claim to have reached level 30 in Tetris. Aackerlund soon disappeared from the scene, but remained known as perhaps the most well-known name in Tetris prior to the domination of 7-time World Champion Jonas Neubauer.

He is a featured player in the 2011 documentary film Ecstasy of Order: The Tetris Masters, which covers his second effort in competitive video gaming at the 2010 Classic Tetris World Championship.

References

Further reading
 "Nintendo King Champ Says Game a Challenge but Anyone Can Play." Pittsburgh Post Gazette.
 "Thor Aackerlund was born to play and win at Tetris." The Dallas Morning News.
 "Business Notebook." The Dallas Morning News.

1977 births
Living people
People from Houston
American esports players